Israel Cidon is an Israeli professor of electrical engineering at Technion. He is an author of more than 220 books and peer-reviewed articles all of which were cited  more than 6905 times and were published in such journals as International Journal of Digital & Analog Cabled Systems and the Journal of Systems Architecture among others.

References

Israeli engineers
20th-century births
Academic staff of Technion – Israel Institute of Technology
Living people
Year of birth missing (living people)